Escalante Department is a  department of Chubut Province in Argentina.

The provincial subdivision has a population of about 143,000 inhabitants in an area of  14,015 km², and its capital city is Comodoro Rivadavia.

The department is named after doctor Wenceslao Escalante, who was part of the Ministry of Agriculture during the presidency of Julio A. Roca.

Attractions

Autodromo Comodoro Rivadavia

Settlements

Caleta Córdoba
Campamento El Tordillo
Ciudadela
Comodoro Rivadavia
Diadema Argentina
El Trébol
Escalante
General Mosconi
Laprida
Palazzo
Rada Tilly
Villa Astra
Villa Ortiz
Puerto Visser
Bahia Bustamante
Rocas Coloradas
Comferpet
Pampa del Castillo
Pampa Salamanca
Rio Chico
Pico Salamanca
Manantiales Behr

References

External links
Comodoro Rivadavia Municipal Website 
Comodoro Rivadavia City Website

States and territories established in 1901
Departments of Chubut Province